Michael L. Waugh (December 17, 1955 – October 8, 2014) was an American politician who served a Republican member of the Pennsylvania State Senate for the 28th District from 1998 until 2014. Previously, Waugh was a member of the Pennsylvania House of Representatives from 1993 through 1998.

Waugh resigned from the State Senate on January 13, 2014, after being diagnosed with cancer. He accepted appointment by Governor Corbett as executive director of the Pennsylvania Farm Show Complex & Expo Center, though died of the disease on October 8, 2014.

References

External links

1955 births
2014 deaths
Businesspeople from Pennsylvania
Republican Party Pennsylvania state senators
Republican Party members of the Pennsylvania House of Representatives
People from York County, Pennsylvania
Politicians from York, Pennsylvania
Pennsylvania State University alumni
Deaths from cancer in Pennsylvania
20th-century American businesspeople